The Netherlands competed at the 2008 Summer Olympics in Beijing, People's Republic of China. This was announced in an official statement on the NOC*NSF website. In the statement they named the Olympic Games and the Paralympic Games as a highlight in sports to which a lot of sportspeople, coaches and the Dutch sports fans would look forward. The Netherlands aimed for a top 10 nations ranking in the Olympics as well as a top 25 ranking in the Paralympics; they ended up ranking 12th at the Games.

Further in the statement they announced that they were aware of the political discussions about human rights and other issues in the People's Republic of China and that they encouraged these discussions, but that they would only participate in sports related discussions. They say individual sportspeople, coaches and managers might have their own opinions about the issues but these would always be conveyed as personal opinions deriving from their own social views. They believe sports activities do have the opportunity to positively influence the situation in the People's Republic of China when it comes to implementing the sports rules correctly as well as in situations improving the levels of respect, solidarity and fair play in sports.

There were 243 athletes representing the Netherlands. 15 in athletics, 24 in baseball, 2 in canoeing, 27 in cycling, 8 in equestrian, 2 in fencing, 32 in field hockey, 18 in football, 2 in gymnastics, 10 in judo, 30 in rowing, 12 in sailing, 15 in softball, 21 in swimming, 3 in table tennis, 1 in taekwondo, 2 in triathlon, 6 in volleyball and 13 in water polo. 61 different athletes won a medal, which is 25.10% of all athletes. With a gold and a silver medal Anky van Grunsven was the only multiple medalist. The athletes that qualified for the 2008 Summer Olympics are listed below.

Medalists

Ambassadors
The NOC*NSF announced a total of eleven athletes as their official ambassadors in the period before, during and after the Olympics in 2008 until the end of that year. The ambassadors that were chosen were all athletes who had a good chance of qualifying for the Olympics or who had already achieved qualification individually or with their team. They were a mixture of men, women, individual athletes, team athletes, Olympians and Paralympians. Chefs de Mission were Charles van Commenée (Olympics) and Thea Limbach (Paralympics).

The eleven ambassadors were:
Anky van Grunsven, Equestrian, 2 times gold and 4 times silver at previous Olympics, 2 times World and 4 times European champion.
Edith Bosch, Judoka, 2004 Summer Olympics silver medallist, World champion and double European champion.
Kees Luyckx, Footballer.
Kenny van Weeghel, Wheeler, 2004 Summer Paralympics gold, silver and bronze medallist, 4 times World and 3 times European champion.
Lobke Berkhout, Sailor, triple 470-class World champion together with De Koning.
Marcelien de Koning, Sailor, triple 470-class World champion together with Berkhout.
Marije Smits, Paralympic runner and long jumper, 2002 World champion in long jumping.
Marleen Veldhuis, Swimmer, 2004 Summer Olympics bronze medallist, 2 times World and 11 times European champion.
Minke Booij, Field hockey player, silver and bronze at previous Olympics, World champion and triple European champion.
Rutger Smith, Discus thrower and shot putter, silver (shot put) and bronze (discus) medallist at World championships.
Theo Bos, Track cyclist, 2004 Summer Olympics silver medallist, 5 times World and 3 times European champion.

Athletics

Dutch athletes have so far achieved qualifying standards in the following athletics events (up to a maximum of 3 athletes in each event at the 'A' Standard, and 1 at the 'B' Standard). Simon Vroemen, who qualified for the steeplechase event, was tested positive for the banned anabolic steroid dianabol in July 2008.

Men
Track & road events

Field events

Combined events – Decathlon

Women
Track & road events

Combined events – Heptathlon

* The athlete who finished in second place, Lyudmila Blonska of the Ukraine, tested positive for a banned substance. Both the A and the B tests were positive, therefore Blonska was stripped of her silver medal, and Keizer moved up a position.

Baseball

The qualification criteria for baseball were the same as the international standards. For European countries the first ranked team at the 2007 European Championship would qualify directly, while the second and third ranked teams would qualify for an extra qualification round. The Dutch team became first in the European Championship, securing their spot in Beijing.

 Roster

Sharnol Adriana
David Bergman
Leon Boyd
Yurendell de Caster
Rob Cordemans
Dave Draijer
Michael Duursma
Bryan Engelhardt
Percy Isenia
Sidney de Jong
Michiel van Kampen
Eugene Kingsale
Dirk van 't Klooster
Roel Koolen
Reily Legito
Diego Markwell
Shairon Martis
Martijn Meeuwis
Danny Rombley
Jeroen Sluijter
Tjerk Smeets
Alexander Smit
Juan Carlos Sulbaran
Pim Walsma

Loek van Mil was originally selected in the squad, but withdrew from the tournament before the games had been started. He was replaced by Draijer.

Results

Canoeing

Slalom

Cycling

Road
Men

Women

Track
Sprint

Pursuit

Keirin

Omnium

Mountain biking

BMX

Equestrian

Dressage

Eventing

Show jumping

Fencing

Men

Women

Field hockey

The qualification criteria for field hockey were the same as the international standards. For European countries the first three ranked teams at the 2007 European Championships would qualify directly, while the fourth through eighth ranked teams would qualify for an extra qualification round, of which only the winners of three qualification tournaments would qualify. The Dutch men's team was first in the European Championship, while the women's team was second in their Championship, each team securing their spot in Beijing.

Men's tournament

Roster

Group play

Semifinal

Bronze medal match

Women's tournament

Roster

Group play

Semifinal

Gold medal match

Football 

The qualification criteria for football were the same as the international standards. For male European countries the first four ranked teams at the 2007 European Under-21 Championship would qualify. The Dutch men's team was first in the European under-21 Championship, claiming their second consecutive title and securing their spot in Beijing.

Men's tournament
Roster

Group play

Quarterfinals

Gymnastics

Artistic
Men

Women

Judo

To qualify for the 2008 Summer Olympics Dutch judokas were required to meet both the international (set by the IOC and IJF) and the Dutch criteria (set by the NOC*NSF).

On 26 January 2008, Elisabeth Willeboordse was the first judoka to secure her spot in Beijing. She proved to remain among the world's top ranked judokas by winning her fifth consecutive World Cup in Sofia. Two days later Edith Bosch qualified by reaching the final of the World Cup in Sofia. On 9 February World Champion Ruben Houkes secured his spot by finishing in the top 7 in the Super World Cup in Paris. The next day Mark Huizinga qualified for his fourth consecutive Olympics as he finished in fifth position at the same event in Paris.

Men

Women

Rowing

Men

*  Lubbers replaced the injured Siegelaar in the repechage.

Women

Qualification Legend: FA=Final A (medal); FB=Final B (non-medal); FC=Final C (non-medal); FD=Final D (non-medal); FE=Final E (non-medal); FF=Final F (non-medal); SA/B=Semifinals A/B; SC/D=Semifinals C/D; SE/F=Semifinals E/F; QF=Quarterfinals; R=Repechage

Sailing

To qualify for the 2008 Summer Olympics Dutch sailors met both the international (set by the IOC and ISAF) and the Dutch criteria (set by the NOC*NSF).

The first two boats to qualify for the Olympics were the women's 470 of Lobke Berkhout and Marcelien de Koning and the finn of Pieter-Jan Postma. Berkhout and De Koning were 2007 World champions in their class, and secured their spot by finishing sixth in the pre-Olympic tournament in Qingdao on 22 August 2007. Postma, who won silver at the 2007 World Championships in the finn class, also qualified during the pre-Olympic tournament by finishing in second place. Brothers Sven and Kalle Coster qualified in the 470 class after finishing 12th in the 2008 World Championships.

Men

Women

Open

M = Medal race; EL = Eliminated – did not advance into the medal race; CAN = Race cancelled

Softball

The qualification criteria for softball were the same as the international standards.  Reaching the semifinals in the 2006 World Championships was an automatic qualification to compete in the Games in Beijing.  The Dutch team did not reach the semifinals, and had to enter the African/European qualification tournament to secure their spot.

Women's tournament
Women's softball team
 – Noemi Boekel
 – Marloes Fellinger
 – Sandra Gouverneur
 – Petra van Heijst
 – Judith van Kampen
 – Kim Kluijskens
 – Saskia Kosterink
 – Jolanda Kroesen
 – Daisy de Peinder
 – Marjan Smit
 – Rebecca Soumeru
 – Nathalie Timmermans
 – Ellen Venker
 – Britt Vonk
 – Kristi de Vries

Swimming

Dutch swimmers have so far achieved qualifying standards in the following events (up to a maximum of 2 swimmers in each event at the Olympic Qualifying Time (OQT), and 1 at the Olympic Selection Time (OST)).

Men

Women

Synchronized swimming

Table tennis

To qualify for the 2008 Summer Olympics Dutch table tennis players needed to meet both the international (set by the IOC and ITTF) and the Dutch criteria (set by the NOC*NSF). Li Jiao qualified herself in January 2008 when she was selected by the ITTF as one of the top 20 players in the World.

Singles

Team

Taekwondo

To qualify for the 2008 Summer Olympics Dutch taekwondo practitioners needed to meet both the international (set by the IOC and WTF) and the Dutch criteria (set by the NOC*NSF). Dennis Bekkers finished third in the qualification tournament in Istanbul, thus qualifying to compete at the Olympics in Beijing.

Triathlon

Volleyball

Beach volleyball

Water polo

The Netherlands participated in the women's tournament, where the team won the gold medal.

Women's tournament

The qualification criteria for water polo were the same as the international standards. The Dutch women's team became first at the European qualification tournament in Kirishi by beating the host nation Russia in the final.

Roster

Group play

All times are China Standard Time (UTC+8).

Quarterfinal

Semifinal

Final

See also
 Netherlands at the 2008 Summer Paralympics

References

Nations at the 2008 Summer Olympics
2008
Summer Olympics